Alpha toxin or alpha-toxin refers to several different protein toxins produced by bacteria, including:

Staphylococcus aureus alpha toxin, a membrane-disrupting toxin that creates pores causing hemolysis and tissue damage
Clostridium perfringens alpha toxin, a membrane-disrupting toxin with phospholipase C activity, which is directly responsible for gas gangrene and myonecrosis
Pseudomonas aeruginosa alpha toxin

Bacterial toxins